Marguerite Standish Cockett, M.D. (August 7, 1878 – April 19, 1954), was an archer, author, artist and World War I ambulance driver.

Biography
She was born on August 7, 1878 in Cooperstown, New York to Willard A. Cockett and Ollie Wood. She graduated from the Woman's Medical College of Pennsylvania in 1905. She was a resident physician at New England Hospital from 1905 to 1906. She did her specialty training in ophthalmology in Paris and London from 1909 to 1910.

On August 24, 1916 she participated in the 38th National Archery Association tournament at Hudson County Park in Jersey City, New Jersey.

During World War I she started a female ambulance driver group with Hope Butler for the Twentieth French Army Corps where they served in Serbia.

She moved back to Cooperstown, New York in 1919. She lived with Marjorie Jackson, and together they operated an antique store they started in 1922.

She died on April 19, 1954 in San Diego, California.

References

External links
Marguerite Standish Cockett at Corbis
 

1878 births
1954 deaths
Woman's Medical College of Pennsylvania alumni
People from Cooperstown, New York
American ophthalmologists
Women ophthalmologists